Farma ("The Farm") is a Slovak reality TV series broadcast on Markíza that debuted in 2011.

The show is set in the natural surroundings of a farm. Contestants are cut off from the outside world. Every week one contestant is selected as the "Farmer of the Week" by the contestant that was previously eliminated. In the first week contestants vote to pick the Farmer of the Week. The Farmer of the Week nominates two people (man and woman) as servants. They are nominated for eviction and other contestants must vote on which of the two servants will become the first duelist. This person then picks their opponent for the duel from among the other contestants (The Farmer of the Week has immunity and cannot be selected). The person they choose will become the second duelist. The second duelist has the right to pick the order of the five disciplines the duel will consist of (e.g. knowledge quiz, tug-of-war, cutting wood). The first person to score 3 points in the duel (1 point is awarded for each discipline that they win) becomes the winner of the duel and is allowed to return to the farm.

Seasons

External links
http://farma.markiza.sk

The Farm (franchise)
2011 Slovak television series debuts
Slovak reality television series
Markíza original programming